Raymond Price House is a historic home located at Columbia, South Carolina. It was built in 1952, and is a two-story, "L"-shaped, steel-framed, masonry dwelling in the Streamline Moderne / International style.  It has a flat roof and front a rear balconies. Also on the property is a one-story structure that is now an office.

It was added to the National Register of Historic Places in 2007.

References

Houses on the National Register of Historic Places in South Carolina
Moderne architecture in South Carolina
International style architecture in South Carolina
Houses completed in 1952
Houses in Columbia, South Carolina
National Register of Historic Places in Columbia, South Carolina